Juan Bautista Vicini Burgos (19 July 1871 – 25 May 1935) was a Dominican political figure. He served as provisional president of the Dominican Republic between 1922 and 1924 during the U.S. military occupation.

Early life

Juan Bautista Vicini was born on 19 July 1871 to Italian immigrant Juan Bautista Vicini Cánepa (born Giovanni Battista Vicini) and his concubine María Burgos Brito. His father arrived to the Dominican Republic during the boom in the sugar industry which he took advantage of to create a respectable operation within a relatively short amount of time. According to the Dutch author H. Hoetink in his book El Pueblo Dominicano, 1850–1900, his father owned two sugar plantations by 1882 and by 1893 was the owner of the sugar mill "Angelina". His friendly relationship with General Ulises Heureaux (Lilís) helped him consolidate a respectable fortune. Vicini inherited his father's business and was able to become a successful businessman mainly by part of his strict European education. Vicini was fluent in Spanish, Italian, English and French at a very young age.

Juan Bautista Vicini never married and had no wife during his presidency.

Political career
The Dominican Republic had been occupied by American Troops since 1916 and after the approval of the Hughes-Peynado plan Vicini was a candidate for the position of provisional President of the Dominican Republic. He was elected President in 1922 and his main goal was to facilitate the evacuation of the United States troops that were present in the Dominican Republic. The day after he was elected, Vicini named the five men who would make up his cabinet. They were as follows:

 José del Carmen Ariza, Secretary of Internal Affairs
 Cayetano Armando Rodríquez, Secretary of Justice and Instruction
 Eladio Sánchez, Secretary of Promotion and Communications
 Manuel Sanabia, Secretary of Health and Charity
 Pedro Pérez, Secretary of Agriculture and Immigration

With these steps, Vicini assured the removal of the North American forces in a peaceful manner. Despite its good intentions, Vicini's regime was plagued and pressured by the tight grip of the Hughes-Peynado plan and by the American forces that were still in the country. Even so, he set up the cleanest elections that the Dominican Republic had ever seen in which Horacio Vásquez won on 15 March 1924 against Francisco J. Peynado.

When Vicini left the presidency after the elections, he went back to his sugar business and abandoned politics for the remainder of his life. At the time of his death on 25 May 1935 Juan Bautista Vicini left his relatives one of the largest sugar enterprises in the Caribbean, which is still operating as of 2010.

References

External links
  27febrero.com

1871 births
1935 deaths
People from Santo Domingo
Dominican Republic people of Italian descent
Presidents of the Dominican Republic
People of Ligurian descent
White Dominicans